Camil Bouchard (born October 27, 1945) is a Quebec politician, teacher and psychology researcher. He was a Member of National Assembly of Quebec from 2003 to 2010, representing the riding of Vachon in Longueuil. He is a member of the Parti Québécois.

He went to Université Laval and obtained a bachelor's and master's degree in psychology. He would add a doctorate at McGill University in 1974. He was then a teacher and researcher at the department of psychology at the Université du Québec à Montréal for 28 years. He was one of the founding members of the Research Lab in Human and Social Ecology in 1979.

Bouchard entered politics in 2003 and was elected in Vachon. He was later named the critic for social solidarity and poverty and then the critic in family and education. Bouchard was narrowly re-elected in 2007, surviving a regional swing to the Action démocratique du Québec. He was the PQ critic for environmental affairs.

On December 14, 2009, he announced his resignation as MNA. The resignation took effect on January 6, 2010.

References

External links
 

1945 births
Living people
McGill University alumni
Parti Québécois MNAs
Université Laval alumni
Academic staff of the Université du Québec à Montréal
People from La Tuque, Quebec
People from Longueuil
21st-century Canadian politicians